Kalorex is an Indian educational institution located in Ahmedabad, Gujarat focusing on K-21 education form pre-school to university. It was founded in 1995 by Manjula Pooja Shroff who is also the current chairperson. As of 2015, Kalorex operates more than 40 institutions including K-12 schools, an IB school, a university for teachers, Pre Schools, CSR Projects and special initiatives in supplementary education.

Initiatives
Visamo Kids Foundation was set up in August 2002 in response to the 2001 Gujarat earthquake. The foundation is a Managing Parentage Home that provides complete care in the form of food, shelter and access to education at CBSE, ICSE and GSEB English Medium Schools to children living below the poverty line from all over the state of Gujarat. As of 2015 the organization supports 92 children. Alumni of the foundations have joined the National Institute of Design, Ahmedabad and are also pursuing careers in Chartered Accountancy and in the engineering field.

VEDIC- Vocational Education and Development Institute Calorx was established to address the skilled manpower needs of the Industry. Its Industry Interface includes industry partnership for Laboratories, Infrastructural Facilities, Faculty Training, Scholarships and Sponsorships for trainees, Curriculum Development, Institute services to the industry, Skilled manpower placements, Project placements, Research & Development etc.

Prerna- Prerna caters to special learning needs of the children, a special education, English medium program for children with Dyslexia. It focuses on concept-driven coaching to meet the children's learning needs.

List of Schools and Educational Institutions
 Delhi Public School Bopal, Ahmedabad
 Delhi Public School, East Ahmedabad
 Calorx olive International School
 Calorx Public School, Mundra
 Calorx Public School, Rajula
 Calorx Public School, Ghatlodia
 Calorx Public School, Bharuch
 Calorx Public School Jaipur
 Calorx Pre-Schools
 Calorx Teachers University

References

 http://www.educationnewsindia.com/2011/04/newspaper-in-education-nie-delhi-public.html
 https://in.news.yahoo.com/few-good-women.html
 http://www.dnaindia.com/india/report-indian-kids-are-smarter-1336870
 http://www.timesworld.in/robotics-workshop-at-calorx-public-school-mundra-gujarat-jan-2015/
 https://www.helpyourngo.com/ngo-details.php?ngo=696&name=Visamo-Kids-Foundation-VKF
 http://360vidz.com/video/611433/sandesh-news-the-success-story-with-mspooja-manjula-shroff-founder-calorx-foundation-part-3.html
 http://www.newindianexpress.com/magazine/article1312958.ece
 http://article.wn.com/view/2014/01/16/Calorx_plans_Rs_400cr_investment/
 http://timesofindia.indiatimes.com/city/ahmedabad/Calorx-foundation-to-start-teachers-university/articleshow/4633174.cms
 http://www.dnaindia.com/academy/report-dyslexia-no-hurdle-in-board-exams-1260223
 http://www.business-standard.com/article/companies/calorx-to-invest-rs-250-cr-for-expansion-in-uae-115010100905_1.html
 http://www.thehindubusinessline.com/news/education/calorx-to-invest-rs-250-cr-to-set-up-16-schools-in-uae/article6745387.ece

External links
 Official website

Schools in Ahmedabad